The École nationale supérieure de chimie, de biologie et de physique or ENSCPB (or "CPB" in common parlance) - which can be translated as Graduate School of Chemistry, Biology and Physics - is one of the French grandes écoles, whose main purpose is to form chemical and physical engineers (with a level "bac+5"). It is located on the campus of the Polytechnic Institute of Bordeaux, in the town of Pessac, close to the famous city of Bordeaux.

In 2009, the school merged with the Institut des sciences et techniques des aliments de Bordeaux (or "ISTAB"). This is when the school changed its name to the current one: École nationale supérieure de chimie, de biologie et de physique (or ENSCBP). Different schooling are proposed in the school, the two biggest being the engineering programs in Chemistry and Physics (or "Formation CP") and in Food Science (or "Formation BA"). The students mostly go abroad for at least 5 months during their 3-year study program, and obtain an Engineering School Diploma, equivalent of a master's degree in Engineering.

References

External links 
 Official website

Bordeaux
Engineering universities and colleges in France
Educational institutions established in 2009
2009 establishments in France